Inland Revenue Department (IRD) Nepal is the department of Nepal Government under Ministry of Finance, located in Lazimpat, Kathmandu. The IRD is currently responsible for the enforcement of Tax Laws and administration of the following taxes: Income Tax, Value Added Tax, Excise Duty  and duties like Entertainment fee (Film Development Fee). 

IRD carries out the following functions:

1. Tax Administration

2. Tax Policy

3. Tax Payer Services

4. Registration, Revenue Collection

5. Tax audit

6. Tax Enforcement and investigation

7. Review & Appeal

8. Tax Refund

9. Advance Ruling

10. Tax Treaty and International Taxation

11. Excises and Liquor Administration

IRD is centrally located in Kathmandu. There are 84 field offices throughout Nepal including 1 Large Taxpayers Office,1 Medium Level Taxpayers Office, 43 Inland Revenue Offices and 39 Taxpayer Service Offices. The previous Department of Taxation was established in 1960. IRD and its district offices are totally running on functional line. Major functions include Taxpayer's Service, Audit and Collection.

References

Government agencies of Nepal
Government departments of Nepal
Taxation in Nepal
1960 establishments in Nepal